Manuel S. Guerrero (8 January 1877 – 4 January 1919) was a Filipino medical doctor who studied beriberi in infants in the Philippines.

Guerrero was born in Ermita, Manila then became part of the Captaincy General of the Philippines on 8 January 1877. He achieved  a Bachelor of Arts degree at the Ateneo Municipal in the year  1894 and a Doctorate on Medicine at the University of Santo Tomas in 1902.

He was also a  writer for the publications "La Republica Filipina, La Independencia, and La Patria". in addition he  was a staff member of the Revista Filipina de Medicina y Farmacia. Guerrero was also a member of the Colegio Medico-Farmaceutico, Asamblea de Medicos y Farmaceuticos de Filipinas, and the Sanggunian ng Kalusagan. He was also one of the founders of t La Infancia and Gota de Leche.

Guerrero was also conferred with a silver medal at the Louisiana Purchase Exposition and the Panama Pacific Exhibition.

References

Filipino pediatricians
Filipino writers
People from Ermita
1877 births
1919 deaths
Manuel
Ateneo de Manila University alumni
University of Santo Tomas alumni
20th-century Filipino medical doctors